The Afghanistan Football Federation stadium is a football stadium in Kabul, Afghanistan and competition venue for some clubs of Afghan Premier League. The AFF stadium has a capacity of 5,000, and the surface is made of artificial turf.

See also 
 Ghazi Stadium, also a Kabul football stadium, which opened in 1923 and has a capacity of 25,000; it is 800m from the AFF Stadium

External links
 Soccerway: AFF Stadium
 Information on the official website of the Afghan Premier League
 Ben Farmer: Afghanistan launches first professional football league; The Daily Telegraph, September 28, 2012
 Afghanistan Football Federation Stadium at Google Maps: images, 360° view

Football venues in Afghanistan
Sport in Kabul
Afghan Premier League
2012 establishments in Afghanistan